This is a list of burn centers in the United States. A burn center or burn care facility is typically a hospital ward which specializes in the treatment of severe burn injuries. As of 2011, there are 123 self-designated burn care facilities in the United States. The American Burn Association (ABA) and the American College of Surgeons (ACS) developed a joint review program to verify burn centers that meet the criteria for optimal care to burn patients. The following list includes burn centers that are known to ABA as of May 2010. Not all listed burn centers on this page have achieved ABA/ACS verification. For a list of verified burn centers, visit the website for the American Burn Association.

Alabama 
 UAB Burn Center
 Children's Hospital of Alabama
 Arnold Luterman Regional Burn Center at the University of South Alabama

Arizona 
 Arizona Burn Center at Valleywise Health

Arkansas 
 Arkansas Children's Hospital Burn Center (adult and pediatric)

California 
 Inland Counties Regional Burn Center
 Leon S. Peters Burn Center at Community Regional Medical Center
 Southern California Regional Burn Center at LAC+USC Medical Center
 University of California, Irvine Medical Center—Burn Center
 University of California, Davis—Regional Burn Center
 Shriners Hospitals for Children—Northern California
 University of California San Diego Burn Center
 San Francisco General Hospital—Burn Service—3A
 Bothin Burn Center at Saint Francis Memorial Hospital
 Santa Clara Valley Medical Center—Regional Burn Center
 The Grossman Burn Center at West Hills Hospital and Medical Center
 The Grossman Burn Center at Bakersfield Memorial Hospital
 Torrance Memorial Medical Center Burn Center
 The Hulse memorial Burn Center
 Orange County Burn Center at Orange County Global
 Edward G. Hirschman Burn Center at Arrowhead Regional Medical Center
 The Burn & Wound Center Doctors Medical Center San Pablo Campus (Closed 4/2015)
 Dameron Hospital Burn Unit (Stockton)

Colorado 
 The Children's Hospital Burn Center
 Swedish Medical Center Burn and Reconstructive Center (Level I Trauma Center)
 University of Colorado Hospital Burn Center
 Western States Burn Center, North Colorado Medical Center

Connecticut 
 Connecticut Burn Center at Bridgeport Hospital

Delaware 
As of 2006, Delaware has no burn centers.

District of Columbia 
 Children's National Medical Center—Burn Unit
 Washington Hospital Center—Burn Center

Florida 
 Orlando Regional Medical Center— Warden Burn Center
 Tampa General Hospital—Tampa Bay Regional Burn Center
 University of Florida—Shands Burn Center
 University of Miami—Jackson Memorial Burn Center
 HCA Florida Kendall Hospital—Burn and Reconstructive Centers of Florida

Georgia 
 Grady Memorial Hospital Burn Center
 The Joseph M. Still Burn Center at Doctors Hospital
 The Joseph M. Still Burn Center at WellStar Cobb Hospital (Austell, GA) Inpatient and Outpatient Clinic

Hawaii 
 Straub Clinic & Hospital Burn Unit

Idaho 
 Eastern Idaho Regional Medical Center

Illinois 
 University of Chicago Burn Center
 Loyola University Medical Center Burn Center
 Memorial Medical Center Regional Burn Center 
 OSF Saint Anthony Medical Center
 Sumner L. Koch Burn Center—John H. Stroger, Jr. Hospital of Cook County

Indiana 
 Indiana University School of Medicine: Riley Hospital for Children at Indiana University Health
 Sidney and Lois Eskenazi Hospital
 St. Joseph's Medical Center—Regional Burn Center
St. Vincent Indianapolis Hospital

Iowa 
 University of Iowa Hospitals and Clinics Burn Treatment Center

Kansas 
 University of Kansas Hospital—Burnett Burn Center
 Ascension Via Christi St. Francis Regional Burn Center

Kentucky 
 Norton Children's Hospital Burn Unit
 University of Louisville Hospital Burn Unit
 Marion Wound and Burn Center

Louisiana 
 Louisiana State University Health Sciences Center Shreveport Regional Burn Center
 Baton Rouge General Medical Center Burn Center
 Louisiana State University Medical Center Regional Burn Center
 The Grossman Burn Center at Our Lady of Lourdes Regional Medical Center

Maine 
 Maine Medical Center—Special Care Unit

Maryland 
 Johns Hopkins Bayview Medical Center—Johns Hopkins Burn Center (Adult, verified)
 Johns Hopkins Hospital—Johns Hopkins Burn Center (Pediatric)
 National Burn Reconstruction Center at Good Samaritan Hospital

Massachusetts 
 Brigham and Women's Hospital Burn Center
 Massachusetts General Hospital—Sumner Redstone Burn Center
 Spaulding Rehabilitation Hospital Burn Rehabilitation Program
 Shriners Hospitals for Children — Boston
 University of Massachusetts Medical School

Michigan 
 University of Michigan Health System
 Children's Hospital of Michigan Burn Center
 The Burn Center Detroit Receiving Hospital
 Hurley Medical Center HMC Burn Unit
 Spectrum Health Regional Burn Center
 Bronson Methodist Hospital Burn and Wound Center
 St. Mary's Medical Center Burn Trauma Intensive Care Unit

Minnesota 
 Miller-Dwan Burn Center
 Hennepin County Medical Center Burn Center
 Regions Hospital Burn Center

Mississippi 
 Joseph M. Still Burn and Reconstruction Center at Central Mississippi Medical Center, Jackson, MS (closed in 2022) 
 Mississippi Firefighters Memorial Burn Center at the Delta Regional Medical Center (closed in 2006)

Missouri 
 University of Missouri Hospital George David Peak Memorial Burn Center
 Children's Mercy Hospital Burn Unit
 Barnes-Jewish Hospital
 Mercy St. Louis Burn Center
 Mercy Springfield Burn Center
 Research Medical Center Grossman Burn Center
 St. Louis Children's Hospital Burn Center

Montana 
Montana as of 2007 has no burn centers. Depending on region and severity, patients may be sent to Idaho Falls, Salt Lake City, or Seattle.

Nebraska 
 St. Elizabeth Regional Burn Center

Nevada 
 Lions Burn Care Center at University Medical Center of Southern Nevada

New Hampshire 
As of 2007, New Hampshire had no burn centers.

New Jersey 
 Saint Barnabas Medical Center Burn Center

New Mexico 
 University of New Mexico Hospital Burn Unit

New York 
 Clark Burn Center of the University Hospital, SUNY Health Science Center – Onondaga
 Erie County Medical Center — Roger W. Seibel Burn Treatment Center, Buffalo, NY
 Harlem Hospital Center—NewYork, NY
 Jacobi Medical Center—Bronx, NY
 Kessler Family Burn/Trauma Unit of Strong Memorial Hospital of University of Rochester School of Medicine – Rochester, NY
 Nassau University Medical Center- Nassau County Firefighters Burn Center—2201 Hempstead Turnpike, East Meadow
 Staten Island University Hospital
 Stony Brook University Hospital- Suffolk County Volunteer Firefighters Burn Center
 Westchester Medical Center – Valhalla
 William Randolph Hearst Burn Center, NewYork-Presbyterian Hospital and Weill Cornell Medicine. — 525 East 68th Street, New York, NY.

North Carolina 
 North Carolina Jaycee Burn Center / UNC Medical Center
 Atrium Health Wake Forest Baptist Davie Medical Center

North Dakota 
North Dakota does not have a burn center; burn patients are sent to North Colorado Medical Center Western States Burn Center or Hennepin County Medical Center Burn Center.

Ohio 
 Akron Children's Hospital Burn Unit (adult and pediatric)
 C. R. Boeckman Regional Burn Center
 Shriners Hospitals for Children—Cincinnati Burns Hospital
 University of Cincinnati Hospital Burn Special Care Unit
 MetroHealth Medical Center Comprehensive Burn Care Center
 Nationwide Children's Hospital Burn Unit
 Wexner Medical Center at Ohio State University Burn Center
 Miami Valley Hospital Regional Adult Burn Center
 St. Vincent Mercy Medical Center Burn Care Center

Oklahoma 
 INTEGRIS Paul Silverstein Burn Center
 Alexander Burn Center

Oregon 
 Legacy Emanuel Hospital Oregon Burn Center

Pennsylvania 
 Lehigh Valley Hospital Burn Center
 St. Christopher's Hospital for Children Pediatric Burn Center
 Temple University Hospital Temple Burn Center
 Thomas Jefferson University Hospital Thomas Jefferson University Burn Center
 UPMC Mercy
 Western Pennsylvania Hospital Burn Trauma Center
 Crozer-Chester Medical Center Nathan Speare Regional Burn Treatment Center

Rhode Island 
 Rhode Island Hospital

South Carolina 
 Medical University of South Carolina Burn Center (Adults and Pediatrics)

South Dakota 
 McKennan Hospital

Tennessee 
 Regional Firefighter's Burn Center- Memphis, TN
 Vanderbilt Burn Center—Nashville, TN

Texas 

 Spencer Memorial Burn Center-TC Jester
 Southwestern Regional Burn Center—Parkland Memorial Hospital
 University of Texas Medical Branch—Blocker Burn Center
 Shriners Hospital for Children-Galveston
 Kyle P. McLeroy Burn Center
 Memorial Hermann Hospital—John S. Dunn Burn Center
 Timothy J. Harnar Burn Center
 US Army Institute of Surgical Research—Fort Sam Houston
 San Antonio Military Medical Center
 University Medical Center – Lubbock (Timothy J. Harnar Burn Center)
 Medical City Plano—The Burn and Reconstructive Center of Texas
 The House of Charity

Utah 
 University of Utah Hospital—Burn Center

Vermont 
 The University of Vermont Medical Center Hospital Campus—Burn Program

Virginia 
 Sentara Norfolk General Hospital Burn Trauma Unit—Eastern Virginia Medical School
 Evans Haynes Burn Center—VCU Medical Center
 Retreat Wound Healing Center—Burn Program

Washington 
 University of Washington Burn Center/Harborview
 Sacred Heart Medical Center Burn Program
 Firefighter's Burn Center—St. Joseph Medical Center

West Virginia 
 Cabell Huntington Hospital's Burn Unit

Wisconsin 
 University of Wisconsin Hospital and Clinics Burn Center
 Columbia St. Marys-Milwaukee Burn Unit
 Children's Hospital of Wisconsin

Wyoming 
As of 2007, Wyoming had no burn centers. Wyoming sends its burn victims to Colorado:
 University of Colorado Hospital Burn Center
 North Colorado Medical Center

References

External links 
 American Burn Association's list of verified burn centers

Burn centers
Burns